Susann Bjørnsen (born 28 May 1993) is a Norwegian breaststroke, freestyle and medley swimmer.

She qualified for competing at the 2016 Summer Olympics in Rio de Janeiro.

She competed at the 2013 World Aquatics Championships in Barcelona, and at the 2014 FINA World Swimming Championships (25 m) in Qatar.

References

External links
 

1993 births
Living people
Norwegian female breaststroke swimmers
Norwegian female freestyle swimmers
Norwegian female medley swimmers
Swimmers at the 2016 Summer Olympics
Olympic swimmers of Norway
21st-century Norwegian women